Indian Prairie School District 204 (abbreviated IPSD) serves roughly 27,400 students from the Illinois communities of Aurora, Bolingbrook, Plainfield and Naperville, in DuPage and Will counties. Currently, one preschool, twenty-one elementary schools, seven middle schools, four high schools, and one alternative high school are in the district. There are thirty-one District 204 schools in Naperville and Aurora and one in Bolingbrook.

History
The district was formed in 1972 by the mergers of Wheatland Elementary District 40, Elementary District 90 and Indian Plains Elementary District 182. The district began as a Kindergarten-8th Grade (K-8) district, with its students attending Naperville Central High School for 9th Grade-12th Grade until Waubonsie Valley High School was constructed for District 204 and opened in 1975. The district opened eleven buildings during the 1990s, at all levels of primary and secondary education. Neuqua Valley High School was introduced to the district in 1997. Another two elementary buildings were opened in 2001-2002, another in 2007, and a third traditional high school, Metea Valley High School, opened in 2009, to relieve overpopulation of Neuqua Valley High School and Waubonsie Valley High School.

Preschools

Elementary schools

Middle schools

High schools

Student Demographics

School Board 
The Indian Prairie School District Board of Education consists of 7 members, each elected for a four-year term. Board members volunteer their time and are a combination of District 204 parents and residents. The Board's major function is to establish educational policies, goals, and objectives for the District. The Board's mission is to inspire all students to achieve their greatest potential.

References

External links
 Official site
 

1972 establishments in Illinois
Bolingbrook, Illinois
Education in Aurora, Illinois
Education in Naperville, Illinois
School districts in Will County, Illinois
School districts established in 1972
School districts in DuPage County, Illinois